Eric Arbuthnot was a South African first-class cricketer.

External links
Cricket-online
Cricket archive

South African cricketers
Eric
1888 births
1966 deaths